Villalba de Perejil is a municipality located in the province of Zaragoza, Aragon, Spain. According to the 2004 census (INE), the municipality has a population of 123 inhabitants.

References

Municipalities in the Province of Zaragoza